Stone Cold Steve Austin and Triple H had formed a tag team known as the Two-Man Power Trip in the World Wrestling Federation/Entertainment (WWF, now known as WWE) for a span of two months in 2001 following WrestleMania X-Seven, but reunited for one night in January 2002. Throughout the team's existence, they held the majority of the WWF's top titles such as the WWF Tag Team Championship which was held by both men while Austin had held the WWF Championship and Triple H also held the WWF Intercontinental Championship twice.

Professional wrestling history

Formation 
At WrestleMania X-Seven, Stone Cold Steve Austin took on The Rock for the WWF Championship in a face vs. face match; however, during the match, Vince McMahon interfered, which eventually led to Austin attacking The Rock with a steel chair to win the WWF Championship and in the process aligning himself with his long-time enemy. The next night on Raw Is War, there would be a rematch between Rock and Austin, this time in a steel cage match. Meanwhile, Triple H demanded to know why McMahon aligned himself with Austin, claiming that he took out Austin (referring to his previous feud with Austin that had ended only a month prior) for him. McMahon arrogantly replied with "Austin was a winner at WrestleMania... you weren't", which led Triple H to leave the arena in frustration.

Later that night, during the Austin-Rock match, Triple H entered the cage with his sledgehammer seemingly to help Rock at first. This was not the case, however, as Triple H, along with Austin, attacked Rock. Austin showed a new, vicious, and much more violent side to him as he would attack wrestlers like The Brothers of Destruction (The Undertaker and Kane), Hardy Boyz (Matt and Jeff), and even Lita with a steel chair several times. The two, who did not christen themselves under any name, were called "The Two-Man Power Trip". On the episode of SmackDown! following WrestleMania, Austin as per request of McMahon assaulted his long-time friend Jim Ross after Ross told Austin his opinion of his alliance with Triple H and McMahon. Later that night, Triple H defeated Chris Jericho to win the Intercontinental Championship. During this time, Triple H actually won the Intercontinental Championship twice; a week after defeating Jericho he was defeated by Jeff Hardy for the belt, but Triple H quickly regained the title on the following Raw. The reigns were his third and fourth overall. Austin would go on to be named Most Hated Wrestler of 2001 by Pro Wrestling Illustrated.

Gaining all of the gold 
While holding both major singles titles, The Two-Man Power Trip (which Triple H and Austin had become known as) began feuding with The Brothers of Destruction (The Undertaker and Kane) after the Brothers stopped a Power Trip attack on the Hardy Boyz. The rivalry got further intensified shortly thereafter when Kane and Undertaker defeated Edge and Christian to win the WWF Tag Team Championship on the April 19 episode of SmackDown!. 

Austin and Triple H began seeking a match with The Brothers of Destruction, looking to further cement their dominance by controlling both major singles titles as well as the tag team titles, a rare feat in the company's history. However, since McMahon was (in storyline) going through a divorce with his wife Linda McMahon, in order for the match to be signed off on he had to agree to terms her lawyers set. Therefore, at Backlash, The Power Trip would not only challenge for the tag team titles but be defending their respective singles titles. Austin and Triple H won the match after Triple H hit Kane with his sledgehammer and pinned him, and as such were in control of all three of the WWF's major championships. They became just the second team ever to simultaneously hold all of the WWF's three primary titles (after Shawn Michaels and Kevin Nash, who were WWF Intercontinental Champion and WWF Champion, respectively, when they won the tag titles for one day on September 24, 1995).

The next night on Raw, McMahon booked an injured Kane in a title match against Austin, only for Linda McMahon to overrule this and give the Undertaker the title shot. However, Austin and Triple H attacked Kane before the match and the match ended in a disqualification. The Power Trip then attacked Kane's arm, giving him an elbow injury. On the next SmackDown!, Undertaker was awarded a rematch versus Austin at Judgment Day. Later, Undertaker attacked Austin during a Triple H-Jeff Hardy title match with a chain and threw him through a glass window. Vince McMahon called for an ambulance, only to reveal that Undertaker was the driver. The Undertaker then attacked McMahon and Austin, and later fought against the returning Rikishi, in a match that ended with a brawl between a returning Austin and Taker. At Insurrextion, Undertaker defeated both members of the Power Trip in a handicap match. Austin's WWF Championship was on the line, but did not change hands because Undertaker pinned Triple H. On the next Raw, Mick Foley managed to make Rikishi leave the Alliance, getting him into a match with Austin, with Undertaker being banned from the building. Austin won the match, only for Rikishi to hit Stephanie with the Stinkface after the match. On the next SmackDown!, The Undertaker called out Austin, and Kane made his return to help his brother. On the May 14 episode of Raw, Triple H challenged Kane to a Chain match for the Intercontinental title at Judgment Day, and the Power Trip offered the Brothers a tag titles shot. Undertaker was informed that his wife, Sara, was involved in a car accident, leaving the arena and making Kane fight the Power Trip by himself. Kane lost that match. Austin then revealed that Sara was fine. On the next SmackDown!, The Undertaker attacked Austin, and Austin said Triple H was the one to call the police. Undertaker demanded a No Holds Barred match with Triple H. Triple H denied the accusations, and Stephanie McMahon revealed that Austin borrowed Triple H's cellphone that Monday. During the match, Stone Cold admitted he called the police, and the match ended in no contest after the Power Trip attacked Undertaker, making Kane run down for the save. At Judgment Day, Austin accidentally hit Triple H with a steel chair during his chain match with Kane, causing Triple H to lose his Intercontinental Championship. Triple H did not return the favor, however; instead, he helped Austin retain his title against the Undertaker in the main event.

The end of the Power Trip 
The next night on Raw, the Two-Man Power Trip faced Chris Benoit and Chris Jericho with the tag team titles on the line. In this match, Triple H suffered a legitimate and career-threatening injury when he misstepped, causing him to suffer a tear in his left quadriceps. Despite his inability to place any weight on his leg, Triple H was able to complete the match. Near the end of the match, Jericho tried to pin Austin, but Triple H got in the ring and tried to hit Jericho with the sledgehammer. Jericho avoided the blow and the sledgehammer instead hit Austin in the chest, a situation Jericho and Benoit took advantage of to win the match and the titles. On the May 24, 2001 episode of SmackDown!, Austin came out to the ring and berated Triple H, blaming him for the tag team title loss and essentially cutting off all ties with him. As a result, the tag team disbanded right before the Invasion angle began.

One night reunion and onwards 
On the January 17, 2002 episode of SmackDown!, the final episode before the Royal Rumble, Triple H and Austin reunited, now as fan favorites, and defeated Kurt Angle and Booker T in a tag team match, though this did not lead to a long-term reunion of the team.

Nine years later on the April 4, 2011 edition of Raw, Austin, who hosted Season 5 of Tough Enough, met with Triple H backstage and the two men shook hands as a sign of respect.

Championships and accomplishments 
 World Wrestling Federation
 WWF Championship (1 time) – Steve Austin
 WWF Intercontinental Championship (2 times) – Triple H
 WWF Tag Team Championship (1 time) – Steve Austin and Triple H
 Triple Crown and Grand Slam Championships - Triple H (by virtue of his Tag Team Championship win)

References

External links 
 Stone Cold's WWE profile
 Triple H's WWE profile
 Mr. McMahon's WWE profile

WWE teams and stables
WWE World Tag Team Champions